The Gnaraloo mulch-slider  (Lerista haroldi)  is a species of skink found in Western Australia.

References

Lerista
Reptiles described in 1983
Taxa named by Glen Milton Storr